Urophora aerea is a species of tephritid or fruit flies in the genus Urophora of the family Tephritidae.

Distribution
Guatemala, Costa Rica, Colombia.

References

Urophora
Insects described in 1942
Diptera of South America